Robert Jacobsen Menendez Jr. (born July 12, 1985) is an American lawyer and politician serving as the U.S. representatives for New Jersey's 8th congressional district since 2023. From June 4, 2021 – January 2, 2023, he served as a commissioner of the Port Authority of New York and New Jersey. He is the son of U.S. Senator Bob Menendez.

Early life and education
Menendez was raised in Union City, New Jersey. He was born to Robert Menendez, a New Jersey attorney and current U.S. senator, and Jane Jacobsen, a public school teacher, school nurse, and guidance counselor. He is Cuban-American by way of his paternal grandparents who came to the United States in 1953, fleeing the regime of Fulgencio Batista. Menendez attended Union City public schools through eighth grade and The Hudson School in Hoboken, New Jersey, for high school, graduating in 2003, and later serving on its board of trustees. He received a Bachelor of Arts degree in political science from the University of North Carolina at Chapel Hill and a Juris Doctor from Rutgers Law School, during which time he was president of the Student Bar Association, served as Notes and Comments Editor for Rutgers Race and the Law Review, received the Alumni Senior Prize, and was selected as a Governor’s Executive Fellow at the Eagleton Institute of Politics.

Early career
Menendez is a lawyer with Lowenstein Sandler LLP. At Lowenstein Sandler, he has served as outside counsel to a wide range of finance and technology companies, often working with founders and executives of traditionally underrepresented backgrounds. He has also worked with The Lowenstein Sandler Center for the Public Interest on a wide variety of matters to serve communities and clients in need of pro bono representation.

Port Authority of New York and New Jersey
On April 15, 2021, Menendez was nominated to be a commissioner of the Port Authority of New York and New Jersey by Governor Phil Murphy. He was unanimously confirmed by the New Jersey State Senate on June 3, 2021, and sworn in on June 4. Menendez's appointment marked the first time a Latino American from New Jersey served on the board, and the first millennial to serve as a commissioner. During his tenure, Menendez chaired the Governance and Ethics Committee and was a member of the Finance Committee, which oversees the Port Authority’s multi-billion-dollar annual budget. He resigned as commissioner on January 2, 2023, the day before he joined Congress.

U.S. House of Representatives

Elections

2022 

As a member of the Democratic Party, Menendez announced his bid for New Jersey's 8th congressional district upon the retirement announcement of incumbent representative Albio Sires, who subsequently endorsed Menendez. His father represented the area before Sires from 1993 to 2006, when it was numbered the 13th congressional district.

Menendez was also endorsed by other political leaders, including New Jersey Governor Phil Murphy, U.S. Senator Cory Booker, State Senator and Union City Mayor Brian Stack, State Senator and North Bergen Mayor Nicholas J. Sacco, Jersey City Mayor Steven Fulop, Newark Mayor Ras Baraka, Elizabeth Mayor J. Christian Bollwage, and others.

Menendez campaigned on addressing the needs of working- and middle-class families and the challenges associated with the rising costs of basic necessities such as housing, healthcare, education and family care. He spoke often about infrastructure investments, gun control, and reproductive choice.

A centerpiece of Menendez's campaign was support for organized labor and workers rights. He was endorsed by numerous labor unions during his campaign, including the Communication Workers of America; International Federation of Professional and Technical Engineers; International Union of Operating Engineers, Local 825; Eastern Atlantic States Regional Council of Carpenters; Hudson County Central Labor Council; American Federation of State, County, and Municipal Employees International Union; International Brotherhood of Electrical Workers Local 164; Hotel Trades Council; New Jersey Education Association; National Education Association; Service Employees International Union 32BJ; Jersey City Police Officers Benevolent Association; Laborers International Union of North America; Hudson County Building and Construction Trades Council; New Jersey State Council of Machinists; Health Professionals & Allied Employees; New Jersey State American Federation of Labor and Congress of Industrial Organization; New Jersey State Building & Construction Trades Council; Professional Firefighters Association of New Jersey; International Association of Fire Fighters; Transport Workers Union of America; New Jersey State Firefighters Mutual Benevolent Association; and Teamsters Joint Council 73.

While running in his own race, Menendez raised and contributed $100,000 to the Democratic Congressional Campaign Committee, with the funds directed to Democratic incumbents and challengers running in battleground districts, of whom a majority were reelected or elected, with a focus on female, LGBTQ+, and other diverse candidates.

In the primary election, Menendez defeated two challengers, David Ocampo Grajales and Ane Roseborough-Eberhard, with 83.6% of the vote to Grajales's 11.3% and Roseborough-Eberhard's 5.1%.

In the general election, Menendez defeated Republican nominee Marcos Arroyo, 73.6% to 23.4%.

Tenure 
As a representative-elect, Menendez was elected by members of the Democratic freshman class to serve as freshman representative on the Democratic Steering and Policy Committee for 2023, a committee that determines the committee assignments of the House Democratic Caucus and works with House Democratic leadership to set policy priorities. He was also appointed to serve as a Regional Whip, a post in which he is responsible for assisting the Democratic Whip operation to track votes and for advising regional Democratic members of Congress on legislation brought to the floor.

Menendez is a member of the Congressional Hispanic Caucus, serving as part of the largest class of Latino Democrats in Congress.

Personal life 
Menendez resides in Jersey City, New Jersey. He married Alex Banfich Menendez in 2017. They have two children.

See also

List of Hispanic and Latino Americans in the United States Congress

References

External links
 Congressman Rob Menendez official U.S. House website
Rob Menendez for Congress campaign website

|-

1985 births
21st-century American lawyers
21st-century American politicians
American politicians of Cuban descent
Democratic Party members of the United States House of Representatives from New Jersey
Hispanic and Latino American members of the United States Congress
Hispanic and Latino American people in New Jersey politics
Living people
New Jersey lawyers
Place of birth missing (living people)
Politicians from Union City, New Jersey
Rutgers Law School alumni
Rutgers University–Newark alumni
The Hudson School alumni
University of North Carolina at Chapel Hill alumni